= Zainab Ghazi =

Bahraini actress

- زينب غازي
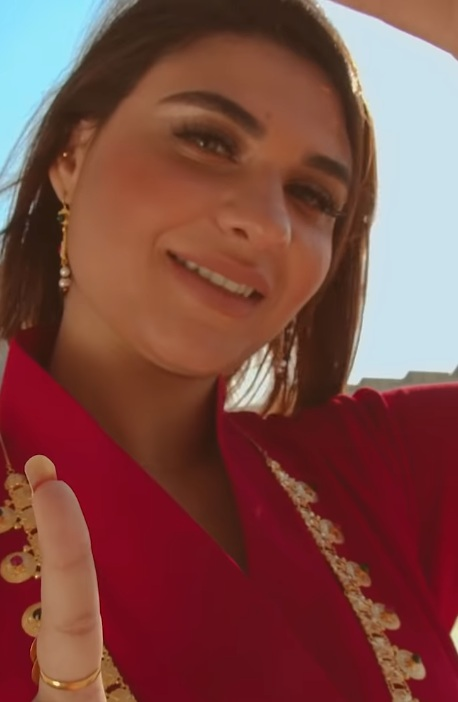
- Zainab Ghazi as she appeared in a 2018 Bahraini Independence Day Music video
- Born: November 21, 1992 (age 33)
- Occupation: actress
- Years active: 2013—Present

Zainab Ghazi (Arabic: زينب غازي, born November 21, 1992) is a Bahraini actress who started her career in Kuwait in 2013.

== Biography ==
Born in Bahrain, she auditioned with Bahraini directors but received no callbacks. Therefore, she left for Kuwait, where her mother and sister lived. Finally, she was cast by famed director Mohammed Daham Al-Shammari in the 2013 series Sir al Hawa.

== Work ==
=== Television series ===
Filmography
Year	Series	Role
2013	Sir al Hawa	Rawan
2014	Thoraya	Sina
2015	Hal Manayer	Mashaer
2015	Fee Amal	Sheikha
2016	Bab Elreh	Khadija
2017	Hayat Thanya	Sahar
2017	Kan Fi kol Zaman (Episode: “Al-Tarma and Umm Al-Sa’af”)	Naima
2017	Amany Al-Umr	Sarah
2017	Al-Youm Al-Aswad	Noora
2018	Al-Muwajaha	Noora
2018	Ifraj Mashrut	Maysa'a
2019	Halet’na Halah	Tahani
2020	Mannequin	Kifah
